Athletes from the United Kingdom, all but three of its Overseas Territories, and the three Crown Dependencies, can compete in the Olympic Games as part of Team GB. Athletes from Northern Ireland (part of the UK) can also choose to compete as part of Team Ireland instead (though most sports in NI are organised on an all-Ireland basis). It has sent athletes to every Summer and Winter Games, since the start of the Olympics' modern era in 1896, including the 1980 Summer Olympics, which were boycotted by a number of other Western nations. From 1896 to 2020 inclusive, Great Britain & NI has won 918 medals at the Summer Olympic Games, and another 32 at the Winter Olympic Games. It is the only national team to have won at least one gold medal at every Summer Games, lying third globally in the winning of total medals, surpassed only by the United States and the former Soviet Union.

Team GB is organised by the British Olympic Association (BOA) as the National Olympic Committee for the UK. While the International Olympic Committee (IOC) and BOA both refer to the team as 'Great Britain' and the team uses the brand name Team GB, the BOA explains that it is a contraction of the full title, the Great Britain and Northern Ireland Olympic Team. Great Britain was one of 14 teams to compete in the first Games, the 1896 Summer Olympics in Athens, and is one of only three nations (France and Switzerland being the others) to have competed at every Summer and Winter Olympic Games. In 1908, the country finished in the Olympic table in first place for the first and only time in its history; its most successful performance both post-War and away from a home Games was in 2016, finishing second.

The most successful British Olympian by gold medals won is Sir Jason Kenny, who has won seven gold medals in track cycling. He is followed by Sir Chris Hoy who won six. Kenny also has the most total medals with 9, followed by fellow cyclist Sir Bradley Wiggins who has eight. Dame Laura Kenny, with five gold medals, has the most golds of any British female athlete and became the first British woman to win gold at three consecutive Olympic Games at Tokyo 2020. She shares the designation of most total medals by a British female competitor with horse-rider Charlotte Dujardin. Sir Steve Redgrave is the only British Olympian to win a gold medal in five consecutive Olympic Games, winning his first in 1984 Los Angeles and last in 2000 Sydney.

At the Winter Olympics as a non-alpine team Great Britain has historically been unable to replicate the amount of success they have achieved in the Summer Olympics although the team enjoyed gold medal success at figure skating through the seventies and eighties, while in recent years, the expansion of the Winter Olympics to include sports such as Curling, Snowboarding, Skeleton and Freestyle skiing has brought some renewed success. Currently, Great Britain is the most successful team in women's skeleton, having won a medal six times, and every gold medal from 2010 to 2018. The most successful Winter Olympian from the Great Britain team is Lizzy Yarnold, with two gold medals, both in the women's skeleton.

Eligibility 

As the National Olympic Committee (NOC) for the United Kingdom, the British Olympic Association (BOA) membership encompasses the four Home Nations of the United Kingdom (England, Northern Ireland, Scotland and Wales), plus the three Crown Dependencies (Guernsey, Isle of Man and Jersey), and all but three of the British Overseas Territories (Bermuda, British Virgin Islands and Cayman Islands have their own NOCs).

Representatives of the devolved Northern Ireland government and others in the region, however, have objected to the name "Team GB" as discriminatory, and have called for it to be renamed as "Team UK" to make it clearer that Northern Ireland is included on the team.

The existence of a Great Britain team has been criticised by Welsh and Scottish nationalists, advocating for separate Welsh and Scottish olympic teams instead.

Under the IOC charter, the Olympic Federation of Ireland is responsible for the entire island of Ireland. However, athletes from Northern Ireland can elect to represent either the UK (in Team GB) or Ireland at the Olympics, as people of Northern Ireland. A number of Northern Irish-born athletes, particularly in boxing, have won medals for Ireland at the Games. All athletes from the whole of Ireland were included in the Great Britain team up until the 1920 Olympics as the entire island was part of the United Kingdom at that time.

Hosted Games 
The United Kingdom has hosted the Summer Games on three occasions – 1908, 1948 and 2012, all in London – second only to the United States. At the 2016 Summer Olympics in Rio, Great Britain became the first team to win more medals at a Summer Olympics immediately after hosting a Summer Olympics; they won 67 medals overall, coming in second place in the medal table ahead of China, two more than in London in 2012. This success came 20 years after finishing 36th in the medal table, after winning just one gold and fourteen other medals at the 1996 Summer Olympics in Atlanta, which led to significant changes in the management and funding of British sports and facilities.

London also won the right to host the 1944 Summer Olympics. However, the 1944 games were cancelled due to the Second World War.

Successful bids

Unsuccessful bids

Potential future bids 
In February 2019, the Mayor of London announced plans to bid for the 2032 or 2036 Olympics, which was backed by UK Sport. However, it has been speculated that either Manchester or Birmingham may be in the frame to host future games, rather than London. In July 2021, the 2032 Games were awarded to Brisbane.

Medals

Medals by Summer Games

Medals by Winter Games

Medals by Summer Sport 

This table excludes seven medals – one gold, two silver, and four bronze – awarded in the 1908 and 1920 figure skating events.

Medals by Winter Sport 

This table includes seven medals – one gold, two silver, and four bronze – awarded in the 1908 and 1920 figure skating events.

List of Winter Olympic medallists
This list also contains the medals won in winter sports at the 1908 and 1920 Summer Olympics, which are not counted in the overall winter Olympic total.

Multiple medallists
The following athletes have won more than one medal for Great Britain at the Winter Olympics, or in winter disciplines. Bold denotes athletes that have not yet retired.

Stripped medal

Great Britain's only stripped medal in Winter Olympic history was an Alpine Skiing bronze at the 2002 Winter Olympics in Salt Lake City. Alain Baxter tested positive for a banned substance, resulting from Baxter using an inhaler product which, unknowingly to him, contained different chemicals in the United States.

Medals by individual

According to official data of the International Olympic Committee. This is a list of people who have won at least three Olympic gold medals or four Olympic medals for Great Britain. Medals won in the 1906 Intercalated Games are not included. It includes top-three placings in 1896 and 1900, before medals were awarded for top-three placings.

People in bold are still active competitors

Lizzy Yarnold is the most successful British athlete at the Winter Olympics, with two gold medals. Duncan Scott is the most prolific athlete at a single Games, winning four medals (1 gold, 3 silver) at the 2020 Olympics. Steve Redgrave is the most consistent British Olympic athlete, winning gold medals at five consecutive Games (1984-2000).

Most successful British Olympian progression
This table shows how the designation of most successful British Olympian has progressed over time. This table ranks athletes by golds, then silvers, then bronzes; the progression would be different if ranked purely by medals.

Most successful in their sport
As of the 2020 Olympics, the following athletes are the most successful (ordered by golds, then silvers, then bronzes) in their sport:
 Jason Kenny (Cycling)
 Ben Ainslie (Sailing)
 Alistair Brownlee (Triathlon)
 Lizzy Yarnold (Skeleton)
 John Wodehouse (Polo)
 John Astor (Rackets)
 John Shepherd, Frederick Humphreys and Edwin Mills (Tug of War)
 John Field-Richards, Bernard Boverton Redwood and Isaac Thomas Thornycroft (Water Motorsports)
 Twelve members of the Devon and Somerset Wanderers team (Cricket)

Steve Redgrave and Reginald Doherty are the most successful male athletes in their respective sports, Rowing and Tennis. Five-time gold medalist Laura Kenny is the most successful female cyclist and Hannah Mills with two gold medals and a silver is the successful woman in sailing. Nicola Adams, with two golds, shares the title of most successful woman in Boxing.

Medals by sport

Alpine skiing

Archery

Medalists

Artistic swimming

Great Britain appeared in the first synchronised swimming competition in 1984.

Athletics

Medalists

Badminton

Great Britain has competed in all Badminton events held at the Summer Olympics since badminton made its full debut as an Olympic sport in 1992.

The figures from 1972 do not count towards the total as badminton was a demonstration sport.

Medalists

Basketball

Biathlon

Bobsleigh

Boxing

Great Britain made its Olympic boxing debut in 1908.

Medalists

Canoeing

Medalists

Cricket

Great Britain and France were the only two teams to compete in the only Olympic cricket match, in 1900. The British team won, making them the only nation to win an Olympic cricket contest and the only Olympic gold medallists in cricket.

Cross-country skiing

Curling

Cycling

Jason Kenny with seven gold and two silver medals is the most successful British Olympian, most successful British cyclist, indeed the most successful cyclist, in Olympic history. His wife, Laura Kenny is the most successful British female Olympian, and most successful Olympic female cyclist in history, with five golds and one silver.
As of 2021, of the 100 cycling medals won by Great Britain, half (50) have been won in the four Games since 2008, including 28 gold medals. Great Britain had won ten golds in total between 1896 and 2008.

Medalists

Diving

Great Britain made its Olympic diving debut in 1908. Jack Laugher with one gold, one silver and one bronze medal is the most successful British Olympic diver in history. Tom Daley, with one gold and three bronze medals, is the most decorated.

Medalists

Equestrian

Great Britain had one rider compete in the hacks and hunter combined event at the first Olympic equestrian events in 1900.

Medalists

Fencing

Great Britain first competed in fencing in 1900 and won its first fencing medal, a silver, in 1908 at the London Games.

Medalists

Figure skating

Great Britain hosted the first Olympic figure skating contests in 1908.

Football

Great Britain and Ireland – now represented separately by Team Ireland and Team Great Britain – was one of three teams to play in the inaugural football tournament, winning their only match to take the first Olympic gold medal in football. The men's team competed in the ten Olympics in the table below. The women's team competed in 2012, and has qualified for 2020.

In 1974, the FA abolished the distinction between "amateur" and "professional" footballers in England. This ended the practice of "shamateurism", where players claimed to be amateur but still got irregular payments from their clubs. Also, Great Britain is not a member of FIFA and its athletes participate in international football competitions as members of the national teams of the home nations (England, Scotland, Wales and Northern Ireland), none of which have National Olympic Committees. As a result, Great Britain usually does not participate in Olympic qualifying tournaments. 

Having qualified as hosts in both tournaments in 2012, pressure arose to find a way for Great Britain, and at least a women's teamm, to take part in Olympic football competitions. The solution, first instituted in time for the 2020 Games, and following the precedent set out by field hockey and rugby sevens was for the results of the England women's team, as the highest ranked national team within Great Britain, to be treated as qualification results for the purposes of UEFA quota places. When both England and Scotland qualified for the FIFA Women's World Cup, the UEFA designated qualification tournament, England's results were treated as Great Britain results for Olympic qualification purposes, while Scottish results were ignored for the same purposes. England's U23 men's team do not have a similar arrangement. Notwithstanding the arrangement, in the event of qualification, Scottish and Welsh players are eligible.

Medalists

Freestyle skiing

Golf

Great Britain was one of four teams to play golf at the first Olympic golf events in 1900, taking silver and bronze in the men's competition. They did not compete in the Olympic golf competition held in 1904. When the sport returned in the 2016 Rio Olympics, after a 112-year absence, Justin Rose won gold.

Medalists

Gymnastics

Great Britain first competed in gymnastics in the inaugural 1896 Olympics, with wrestler Launceston Elliot entering the rope climbing event and finishing last. Great Britain's first gymnastics medal came in 1908 with a silver in the men's individual all-around. Until 2008, Great Britain's last medal for gymnastics was a Bronze in the Women's all-round team event in 1928. At the 2012 Summer Games in London, Great Britain equaled its tally for all previous games combined, winning 4 medals to bring their all-time total to eight. A record seven medals, including first ever gold medals, were won in 2016, while a further three, including one gold, were won at the 2020 Games. Having won only four medals in total between 1896 and 2008, 14 medals, including 3 gold medals were secured between 2012 and 2020.

Medalists

Handball

Great Britain's men's and women's handball teams were allowed to take up host places at the 2012 Olympics. This is the only time that Great Britain has competed in handball at the Olympics.

Field hockey

Great Britain hosted the first Olympic field hockey tournament in 1908.

Medalists

Ice hockey

Jeu de paume
Great Britain hosted the only Olympic jeu de paume tournament in 1908.

Judo

Great Britain has competed in all judo events held at the Summer Olympics since judo made its full debut as an Olympic sport in 1964. Although Great Britain has won 20 judo medals, none have been gold.

Medalists

Lacrosse

Great Britain's Olympic lacrosse debut was in 1908.

Luge

Modern pentathlon

Great Britain's Olympic modern pentathlon debut was in 1912 when it was first included in the Olympics. Their most successful games were the 2020 Tokyo Olympics, where Great Britain won both the available gold medals.

Medalists

Nordic combined

Polo

Great Britain was one of four teams to compete in the debut of Olympic polo. Three of the five teams had British players, and those three teams took both the top two places and split the third place with the Mexican team. Great Britain would be the only team to play in all five of the Olympic polo tournaments, with no other nation appearing more than three times. The nation took gold and two silvers in 1908, when only British teams competed. Facing international competition in 1920, the British side won. The 1924 tournament resulted in a bronze medal for Great Britain, while the team took silver in 1936. In international play, the Great Britain team had an overall record of 5–3 (semifinal and final wins in 1920, a 2–2 record the 1924 round-robin, and a first-round win and final loss in 1936). There were 2 games in 1908 pitting teams from Great Britain against each other, necessarily resulting in a 2–2 record that year. The mixed teams in 1900 had records of 3–0, 1–1, and 0–1, though both losses (and, of course, therefore two of the wins) were against each other.

Rackets
Great Britain hosted the only Olympic rackets tournament, in 1908.

Rowing

Great Britain took a bronze medal in the first Olympic rowing competition, in 1900.

Medalists

Rugby
 

Great Britain took a silver medal in the first Olympic rugby competition, in 1900. They repeated as silver medallists by losing the only match in 1908. Great Britain did not compete in 1920 or 1924. When the sport returned in 2016 as rugby sevens, Great Britain earned a third silver medal (in men's) as well as placing 4th in the first women's rugby competition.

Sailing

Great Britain took four gold medals in the first Olympic sailing events in 1900. In addition, British sailors were part of two mixed teams that won gold.

Medalists

Shooting

Great Britain's first shooting medals came when the United Kingdom hosted the 1908 Games, at which the British shooters dominated the competitions. There were 215 shooters from 14 teams in the shooting events, including 67 from Great Britain.

Medalists

Short track speed skating

Skateboarding

Medalists

Skeleton

Great Britain is the most successful team in Skeleton winning a medal at every Games in which the sport has been included and has won at least one medal in each of the five contests of Women's skeleton since its introduction with five different athletes. Lizzy Yarnold is the most successful Skeleton rider of all time winning back to back gold medals in 2014 and 2018. No other rider has successfully defended a gold medal.

Ski jumping

Snowboarding

Speed skating

Sport climbing

Swimming

Great Britain was the third most successful team in swimming in 2008, with 2 golds, 2 silvers and 2 bronzes, with Rebecca Adlington winning two of these, making her the most successful female British swimmer in 100 years.

Medalists

Table tennis

Taekwondo

Great Britain have competed in all six taekwondo competitions that have taken place since 2000. Their best result is a gold, silver and bronze in 2016.

Medalists

Tennis

John Pius Boland dominated the 1896 tennis tournaments. Tennis in 1896 was a sport that allowed mixed teams, and both Boland and George S. Robertson joined partners from other nations to win their medals. Great Britain again dominated in 1900, taking all four gold medals and adding seven others (three as part of mixed teams).

Medalists

Triathlon

Great Britain have competed in all Six triathlon competitions that have taken place since 2000. Their best finish is 2 1st-place finishes in the men's individual triathlon event, and a 1st-place finish in the mixed triathlon relay event, in 2020(2021).

Medalists

Tug of war

Great Britain's Olympic tug of war debut came when the United Kingdom hosted the Games in 1908. Great Britain was then one of only two teams to compete in 1912 and also won the last Tug of War competition held in the Olympics in 1920.

Volleyball

Prior to participating, as host nation, in the 2012 volleyball tournaments, Great Britain had never competed in Olympic volleyball with the exception of the women's team participating in the inaugural Beach volleyball tournament in 1996.

Water motorsports
The United Kingdom hosted the only Olympic water motorsports contests, in 1908.

Water polo

Medalists

Weightlifting

Great Britain's only gold medal in weightlifting came at the first Games in 1896, when Launceston Elliot won the one-hand lift.

Medalists

Wrestling

Medalists

See also
 List of flag bearers for Great Britain at the Olympics
 :Category:Olympic competitors for Great Britain
 Great Britain at the Paralympics
 Great Britain at the European Games
 Great Britain at the Youth Olympics

Notes

References

External links